Antiblemma nannodes is a moth of the family Noctuidae first described by George Hampson in 1926. It is found in Jamaica and Cuba.

References

Catocalinae
Moths of the Caribbean